Omar Nizar Mikati is a Lebanese actor and voice actor.
Omar Nizar Mikati was born in Lebanon in 1944.

Filmography

Film
The Blind of the Cathedral - Grocer (Short Film). 2015
Max w Antar. 2016
Princess of Rome (Voice only). 2015
Don't Tell Me the Boy Was Mad - Narguiz. 2015
Tuff Incident. 2007
Taxi Ballad - Old man in cab. 2001

Television
Noktit Hob. 2015
The Team - Abo Omar. 2011
Scenario - Rouba's father. 2011
Dr. Hala. 2008
Metel El Amar 2016

Dubbing roles
Mokhtarnameh
Prophet Joseph - Ankh Mahoo
Saint Mary
The Men of Angelos

Awards

References

External links

Theatre Plays:2012-2017

.Mesh Mekhtelfin (مش مختلفين)

.Wara El Beb (ورا الباب)

.Natrino(نطرينوا)

.Maa' El Waa't ..Yemkin (مع الوقت ..يمكن)

.Bel Kawalis (بلكواليس)

Living people
Lebanese male actors
Lebanese male voice actors
Lebanese male television actors
21st-century Lebanese male actors
1944 births